Deuterarcha is a genus of moths of the family Crambidae. The genus was described by Edward Meyrick in 1884.

Species
Deuterarcha xanthomela Meyrick, 1884
Deuterarcha flavalis Hampson, 1893

References

Spilomelinae
Crambidae genera
Taxa named by Edward Meyrick